Elsa Lundanes (born 22 May 1953) is a Norwegian chemist.

She was born in Ålesund and took her cand.real. degree in 1978. After two years at Texas University she took the dr.scient. degree in 1986. She worked in the pharmaceutical industry for Nycomed before she was employed by the University of Oslo in 1988. Her specialty is analytical chemistry. She became professor in 1999 and a member of the Norwegian Academy of Science and Letters in 2009.

References

1953 births
Living people
People from Ålesund
Norwegian chemists
Analytical chemists
Norwegian expatriates in the United States
Academic staff of the University of Oslo
Members of the Norwegian Academy of Science and Letters